Akhmerovo (Äxmär) is a rural locality (a village) in Ishlinsky Selsoviet, Aurgazinsky District, Bashkortostan, Russia. The population was 67 as of 2010. There are 3 streets.

Geography 
Akhmerovo is located 29 km north of Tolbazy (the district's administrative centre) by road. Novotimoshkino is the nearest rural locality.

References 

Rural localities in Aurgazinsky District